The Glide may refer to:
Clyde Drexler, an American basketball player
A move commonly used in card magic